Ankeena Networks was a US-based new media infrastructure technology company that was acquired by Juniper Networks in 2010 for US$100 million.

See also
 List of acquisitions by Juniper Networks

References

Juniper Networks
Mass media companies established in 2008
Mass media companies disestablished in 2010
Software companies established in 2008
Software companies disestablished in 2010
Defunct software companies of the United States